Fisher is an unincorporated community on the South Branch Potomac River in Hardy County, West Virginia, United States. It lies west of Moorefield.  The precise origin of its name is unclear.  It may be named generally for the Fisher family that lived in its vicinity, or more specifically for George Fisher, whose family lived on the South Branch approximately one mile due south of Fisher.

References

Unincorporated communities in Hardy County, West Virginia
Populated places on the South Branch Potomac River
Unincorporated communities in West Virginia